Gaianus may refer to:

Gaianus of Tyre, Roman governor of Phoenicia in 362
Gaianus of Alexandria, Christian patriarch in 535
Gaianus of Arabia, Roman sophist of the 3rd century